Medina in Saudi Arabia is the second holiest city in Islam.

Medina, Medinah, or Madinah may also refer to:

Military operations
 Battle of Medina, an 1813 battle of the Mexican War of Independence
 Siege of Medina Fort, an 1857 battle in present-day Mali
 Operation Medina, a 1967 Vietnam War search-and-destroy operation

Music
 Medina (duo), a Swedish hip hop duo
 Medina (album), a 1980 album by Bobby Hutcherson

Names
 Medina (given name)
 Medina (surname) 
 De Medina (surname)

Places 
 Medina quarter, the old Arab quarter of a North African or Maltese town

Antarctica
 Mount Medina, Graham Land
 Medina Peaks, Ross Dependency

Colombia
 Medina Province, Cundinamarca
 Medina, Cundinamarca, a municipality in the Cundinamarca Department

Ghana
 Madina, Ghana, a large town
 Madina (Ghana parliament constituency), a parliamentary constituency in Ghana

Pakistan
 Madina Colony (New Karachi Town), Karachi, Sindh province
 Madina Colony (Orangi Town), Karachi, Sindh province
 Madina Town, Punjab province

United Kingdom
 Medina, Isle of Wight, United Kingdom, a former borough
 River Medina, a river on the Isle of Wight, United Kingdom

United States
 Medinah, Illinois, an unincorporated community
 Medinah Country Club, a famous golf club located in the above community
 Medina, Kansas
 Medina, Minnesota, a city
 Medina, New York, a village
 Medina, North Dakota, a city
 Medina, Ohio, a city
 Medina County, Ohio 
 Medina, Tennessee, a city
 Medina, Bandera County, Texas, an unincorporated community
 Medina, Zapata County, Texas, a census-designated place
 Medina County, Texas
 Medina River, Texas
 Medina Valley, Texas
 Medina, Washington, a city
 Medina, West Virginia, an unincorporated community
 Medina, Wisconsin, a town
 Medina, Outagamie County, Wisconsin, an unincorporated community
 Medina Junction, Wisconsin, an unincorporated community

Elsewhere
 Medina, Western Australia, a suburb of Perth, Australia
 Medina, Minas Gerais, Brazil, a municipality in the state of Minas Gerais
 Medina, a community in Zorra Township, Ontario, Canada
 Medina, Dominican Republic, a municipal district in San Cristóbal (province)
 Medina, Hungary, a village in Tolna County
 Mdina, Malta, a city
 Medina, New Zealand, a locality in Hurunui District, New Zealand
 Medina, Misamis Oriental, Philippines, a 4th class municipality
 Al Madinah Region, Saudi Arabia
 Medina, Dakar, Senegal, a commune d'arrondissement of the city of Dakar
 Wadajir District or Medina, a district of Mogadishu, Somalia

Publications
 Medina (magazine), Spanish weekly women's magazine (1941–1945)
Madina (Bijnor), Urdu biweekly newspaper in India (1912–1975)
 Al Madina (newspaper), daily newspaper in Jeddah, Saudi Arabia

Schools
 Medina High School (Medina, Ohio)
 Medina High School (Texas)

Ships and naval vessels
 Medina-class gunboat, a class of Royal Navy gunboats built between 1876 and 1877
 HMS Medina (1840), a 2-gun Merlin-class paddle packet boat
 HMS Medina (1916), an Admiralty M-class destroyer 
 Hunter Medina, a yacht produced by British Hunter boats
 Medina (1811 ship), a West Indiaman
 RMS Medina (1911), a steamship liner
 SS Medina (1914), an ocean liner
 HMS Medina, a list of Royal Navy ships
 List of ships named Medina

Other uses
 MEDINA, a universal pre-/postprocessor for finite element analysis of T-Systems
 Medina (board game)
 Medina (fly), a genus in the family Tachinidae
 The Medina, an 1876 English contract-law case
 Earl of Medina, a title in the Peerage of the United Kingdom
 Medina Dam, Texas
 Museum Medina, Braga, Portugal
 Saunders Medina, a British flying boat of the 1920s

See also 
 Dukes of Medina Sidonia, a Spanish noble family
 Madina (disambiguation)
 Madinah (disambiguation)
 Medina College (disambiguation)
 Medina Township (disambiguation)
 Medina de Pomar, a town in Burgos, Spain
 Medina de Rioseco, a town in Valladolid province, Spain
 Medina del Campo, a town in Valladolid province, Spain
 Medīnat Yisrā'el, the official name of the state of Israel in Hebrew